The 1929 European Wrestling Championships were held in  the men's Freestyle style  in Paris 14 - 16 February 1929; the Greco-Romane style and  in Dortmund 3 - 5 April 1929.

Medal table

Medal summary

Men's freestyle

Men's Greco-Roman

References

External links
FILA Database

1929 in European sport
Sports competitions in France
Sports competitions in Germany